Calvary Episcopal Church, located at 102 North Second Street at Adams Avenue, in Memphis, Tennessee, in the United States, is an historic Episcopal church, founded August 6, 1832 by the Rev. Thomas Wright.  The nave (consecrated May 12, 1844) is the oldest public building in continuous use in the city of Memphis and was designed by Calvary's second Rector, The Rev. Philip Alston.  There were several later additions:  a tower in 1848, the chancel in 1881, the Parish Hall in 1903, and the Education Building in 1992.  As Calvary Episcopal Church and Parish House, it was listed on the National Register of Historic Places in 1982.

Parish Information
Calvary is an active parish in the Episcopal Diocese of West Tennessee.

Current clergy are: 

The education wing houses the Calvary Place Child Care Center, which serves working parents in downtown Memphis. Since 1928, the volunteer-run Waffle Shop has provided downtown Memphians with a simple weekday lunch during the season of Lent. The profits support outreach ministries of congregations throughout the city.

See also

List of Registered Historic Places in Tennessee

References

External links
 Calvary Episcopal Church website
 National Register listings for Shelby County

Messiah
Churches on the National Register of Historic Places in Tennessee
Churches in Memphis, Tennessee
National Register of Historic Places in Memphis, Tennessee